This is a list of years in the Republic of China.

Years of the 20th century in China
Years of the 20th century in Taiwan
Years of the 21st century in Taiwan